Saša Gajser (born 11 February 1974) is a Slovenian football coach and former player who played as a midfielder. Gajser was internationally capped for Slovenia, earning 27 appearances between 1999 and 2003.

Club career
Gajser started his professional career with Maribor in 1992. He stayed there for three seasons, making 22 appearances in all competitions. Later, he had spells with the second division sides Drava Ptuj and Ljubljana. After a season at Beltinci, he signed with Rudar Velenje. He stayed there for two seasons, appearing in 64 league matches and scoring 6 goals before leaving for KAA Gent. After three seasons in Belgium, he moved to Olympiakos Nicosia.

International career
Gajser played 27 matches and scored one goal for Slovenia between 1999 and 2003 and was a participant at the UEFA Euro 2000 and the 2002 FIFA World Cup.

Career statistics

International goals
Scores and results list Slovenia's goal tally first.

Honours

Player
Maribor
Slovenian Cup: 1991–92, 1993–94

Rudar Velenje
Slovenian Cup: 1997–98

See also
NK Maribor players
Slovenian international players

References

External links
Player profile at NZS 

1974 births
Living people
People from Ptuj
Slovenian footballers
Association football midfielders
Slovenian expatriate footballers
NK Maribor players
NK Drava Ptuj players
NK Ljubljana players
NK Beltinci players
NK Rudar Velenje players
Expatriate footballers in Belgium
Expatriate footballers in Cyprus
K.A.A. Gent players
Olympiakos Nicosia players
Slovenian PrvaLiga players
Slovenian Second League players
Belgian Pro League players
Cypriot First Division players
Slovenian expatriate sportspeople in Belgium
Slovenian expatriate sportspeople in Cyprus
UEFA Euro 2000 players
2002 FIFA World Cup players
Slovenia international footballers
Slovenian football managers
NK Maribor managers